Brayan Rene Villarreal (born May 10, 1987) is a Venezuelan former professional baseball pitcher. He has played in Major League Baseball (MLB) for the Detroit Tigers and Boston Red Sox. He is 6'0" tall and weighs 170 pounds.

Minor league career
Villarreal signed with the Detroit Tigers and began his professional career in 2006, pitching for the VSL Marlins/Tigers and going 0–2 with a 3.48 ERA in 14 games (five starts). He moved to the United States in 2007, though he pitched in only one game that season—for the GCL Tigers, with whom he went 0–0 with a 6.23 ERA. In 2008, he pitched for both the GCL Tigers (11 games, six starts) and West Michigan Whitecaps (one start), going a combined 1–6 with a 4.69 ERA. In 2009, he pitched for the Whitecaps again, going 5–5 with a 2.87 ERA in 26 games (16 starts), striking out 118 batters in 103 innings of work. He split 2010 between the Lakeland Flying Tigers and Erie SeaWolves, going a combined 7–8 with a 3.55 ERA in 24 starts. He struck out 136 batters in 129 innings pitched.

Villarreal was ranked among the top 20 Tigers prospects by Baseball America following the 2009, 2010, and 2011 seasons.

Major league career
Villarreal made the Tigers out of spring training in 2011, bypassing the Triple-A level. He made his major league debut on April 2 against the New York Yankees.

On April 12, 2011, Villarreal achieved a rare feat. Entering the game with a man on first and two outs, he picked off the runner immediately. With that, Villarreal recorded a hold without throwing a single pitch.

He spent 16 games at the major league level in 2011, going 1–1 with a 6.75 ERA. In 16 innings, he allowed 21 hits and 10 walks, while striking out 14 batters. He spent much of the season in the minor leagues, going 3–5 with a 5.05 ERA in 17 games (10 starts) for Triple-A Toledo.

On April 8, 2012, Villarreal was called up from Triple-A Toledo after Doug Fister went on the disabled list with an injured side. Villarreal had pitched in one game with Toledo.  In  innings pitched, Villareal notched a 3–5 record with 2.63 ERA, 66 strikeouts, and nine holds. However, he was not selected to the Tigers' playoff roster that won the American League pennant. In the minors, he had a 1.29 ERA in eight relief appearances that year.

On July 30, 2013, Villarreal was traded to the Boston Red Sox along with Jake Peavy in a three-team trade that sent Avisail García and Francellis Montas to the Chicago White Sox and José Iglesias to the Detroit Tigers. He was designated for assignment by the Red Sox on January 22, 2014.

Though Villarreal threw only four pitches for the Red Sox in 2013 (a walk-off bases-loaded walk against the San Francisco Giants at AT&T Park), his lone appearance still qualified him for a 2013 World Series ring, which he received during the championship ring ceremony at Fenway Park in April 2014. He became a free agent after the 2014 season.

He has since retired from professional baseball.

Repertoire
Villarreal throws three pitches: a four-seam and two-seam fastball that tops out at about 100 mph, and a slider in the upper 80s. Villarreal likes to get ahead of hitters with his fastballs and then use his slider to put them away.

Personal life
In March 2013, Villarreal's family home in Venezuela was attacked by three armed robbers who threatened to kidnap his relatives in the future. Police were alerted to suspicious circumstances by a neighbor. The robbers had assaulted Villarreal's father and threatened to kill his mother and younger brother if they made any noise when officers arrived.

Villareal married former Miss Rhode Island and North Bay Village, Florida Commissioner Julianna Clare Strout. In October 2021, she posed as a paralegal three times in order to enter Krome Service Processing Center, a migrant detention center in Miami, so that she could visit Villareal, who was being detained there. She claimed to be eight months pregnant with his child. She subsequently pled guilty to entering a federal facility using fraud and false pretenses.

See also
 List of Major League Baseball players from Venezuela

References

External links

, or Retrosheet, or Venezuelan Professional Baseball League

1988 births
Boston Red Sox players
Caribes de Anzoátegui players
Detroit Tigers players
Erie SeaWolves players
Gulf Coast Red Sox players
Gulf Coast Tigers players
Lakeland Flying Tigers players
Living people
Lowell Spinners players
Major League Baseball pitchers
Major League Baseball players from Venezuela
Pawtucket Red Sox players
Tiburones de La Guaira players
Toledo Mud Hens players
Venezuelan expatriate baseball players in the United States
Venezuelan Summer League Tigers/Marlins players
West Michigan Whitecaps players
People from La Guaira